Đoàn Kiến Quốc (born March 24, 1979 in Nha Trang) is a Vietnamese table tennis player. He won a gold medal, along with his partner Dinh Quang Linh in the men's doubles, at the 2009 Southeast Asian Games in Vientiane, Laos. As of November 2012, he is ranked no. 275 in the world by the International Table Tennis Federation (ITTF). Doan is also left-handed, and uses the shakehand grip.

Doan made his official debut for the 2004 Summer Olympics in Athens, where he competed in the men's singles. He lost the first preliminary round match to a Chinese-born Italian table tennis player Yang Min, with a set score of 1–4.

At the 2008 Summer Olympics in Beijing, Doan qualified for the second time in the men's singles, after receiving a ticket from the Southeast Asian Qualification Tournament in Singapore. Unlike his previous Olympics, Doan defeated Australia's David Zalcberg and Olympic veteran Christophe Legoût of France in the preliminary rounds, before losing out his next match to Russia's Alexei Smirnov, with another set score of 1–4.

References

External links
 
 
 
 
 
 NBC Olympics Profile

Vietnamese table tennis players
Table tennis players at the 2004 Summer Olympics
Table tennis players at the 2008 Summer Olympics
Olympic table tennis players of Vietnam
People from Nha Trang
1979 births
Living people
Table tennis players at the 2010 Asian Games
Table tennis players at the 2006 Asian Games
Table tennis players at the 2002 Asian Games
Southeast Asian Games medalists in table tennis
Southeast Asian Games gold medalists for Vietnam
Southeast Asian Games silver medalists for Vietnam
Competitors at the 2005 Southeast Asian Games
Competitors at the 2009 Southeast Asian Games
Asian Games competitors for Vietnam